The 1995 Eastern Creek 12 Hour was an endurance race for GT Production Cars. The event was staged at the Eastern Creek Raceway in New South Wales, Australia on 27 August 1995. The field was divided into the following six classes:
Class A : Small Cars - Up to 1850cc
Class B : Medium Cars - 1851 to 2600cc
Class S : Sports Cars - Up to 2000cc
Class T : Turbo and/or 4WD High Performance Cars
Class V : V8 Engines & High Performance 6 Cylinders
Class X : Extra High Performance Cars
This was the first and, to date, only 12 Hour race to be held at Eastern Creek Raceway.

Final results were as follows:

Italics indicate driver qualified but did not race

References

Australian Motor Racing Year, 1995
Auto Action, 30 August 1995
Auto Action, 6 September 1995

External links
 1999 FD3S SP, www.rx7.net.nz
 1995 Eastern Creek 12 Hour Preview & Compilation, www.youtube.com

Eastern Creek 12 Hour
Motorsport at Eastern Creek Raceway
August 1995 sports events in Australia